Veerashaivism is a sect within the Shaivism fold of Hinduism. According to tradition, it was transmitted by Panchacharyas, ( from ), or five acharyas: Renukacharya, Darukacharya, Ekorama, Panditharadhya, Vishwaradhya, and first taught by Renukacharya to Agastya, a Vedic seer. The preachings of Jagadguru Renukacharya Bhagavadpada to rishi Agastya is recorded in the form of a book, Shri Siddhantha Shikhamani, which is regarded as an important holy book for the Veerashaivas. This text is likely an 8th century work, and it likely contains the earliest reference to Veerashaivism in literature.

Guru lineage 
A small manuscript named Vira-Saiva-Guru-Parampara details the following guru lineage for Veerashaivism in order of priority: Visvesvara Guru, Ekorama, Viresaradhya, Virabhadra, Viranaradhya, Manikyaradhya, Buccayyaradhya, Vira Mallesvaradhya, Desikaradhya, Vrsabha, Aksaka, and Mukha Lingesvara. Viranaradhya is the father of the 18th century Telugu Veerashaivite acharya Mulugu Papayaradhya. 

In the Virasaiva Agama, it is mentioned that in four main pontiff seats (Yoga Peetha, Maha Peetha, Jnana Peetha, and Soma Peetha), there are four gurus of different priority: Revana, Marula, Vamadeva, and Panditaradhya.

Panchacharyas
According to tradition, the Panchacharyas arose out of five great Sthavaralingas located in Kolanupaka in Aler town, Yadadri district, Telangana, Ujjain in Madhyapradesh, Kedar in Uttarakhand, Srisailam in Andhra Pradesh, and Kashi or Banaras in Uttar Pradesh under different names in different Yugas. The Panchacharyas established five peethas, which play an important role in Veerashaiva.

The five peetha of Veerashaiva
 Veerasimhasana of Rambhapuri in Balehonnuru (Karnataka)
 Saddharma Shimhasana of (Ujjain) (Madhyapradesh) later moved to Ujjini (Karnataka)
 Vairagya Shimhasana of Kedar (Uttarakhand) 
 Surya Shimhasana of Srisailam (Andhra Pradesh) and
 Jnana Shimhasana of Kasi (Uttar Pradesh)

Peethas
Veerashaivism is continued to this day and is preserved and transmitted by five peethas  (Rambhapuri, Ujjaini, Kedar, Shreeshail, Kashi), who play an essential role in the Veerashaiva tradition.

Philosophy
The philosophy of Veerashaivism is explained in Siddhanta Shikhamani. While the Veerashaiva-tradition incorporates Vedic elements, the origin of panchacharyas has been explained in Sivagamas, especially in Svayambhuva Agama, Suprabhedagama and Viragama. The earlier portions of Agama literature are the fundamental source of Saiva religion, while the latter portions are of special importance to Veerashaivism. However, Veerashaivism differs from Agamic Shaivism and Pasupata Shaivism in its philosophy, in its doctrine of sthala, in the special kind of lingadharana, and in certain ritualistic elements.

References

 
Shaivism
Hinduism-related lists
Hindu traditions